Stanstead/Weller Airport  is located  northeast of Stanstead, Quebec, Canada.

References

Registered aerodromes in Estrie
Stanstead, Quebec